Melanie Mitchell is an American scientist. She is the Davis Professor of Complexity at the Santa Fe Institute. Her major work has been in the areas of analogical reasoning, complex systems, genetic algorithms and cellular automata, and her publications in those fields are frequently cited.

She received her PhD in 1990 from the University of Michigan under Douglas Hofstadter and John Holland, for which she developed the Copycat cognitive architecture. She is the author of "Analogy-Making as Perception", essentially a book about Copycat.  She has also critiqued Stephen Wolfram's A New Kind of Science and showed that genetic algorithms could find better solutions to the majority problem for one-dimensional cellular automata. She is the author of An Introduction to Genetic Algorithms, a widely known introductory book published by MIT Press in 1996.  She is also author of Complexity:  A Guided Tour (Oxford University Press, 2009), which won the 2010 Phi Beta Kappa Science Book Award, and Artificial Intelligence: A Guide for Thinking Humans (Farrar, Straus, and Giroux).

Life 
Melanie Mitchell was born and raised in Los Angeles, California. She attended Brown University in Providence, Rhode Island, where she studied physics, astronomy and mathematics. Her interest in artificial intelligence was spurred in college when she read Douglas Hofstadter's Gödel, Escher, Bach.

After graduating, she worked as a high school math teacher in New York City. Deciding she "needed to be" in artificial intelligence, Mitchell tracked down Douglas Hofstadter, repeatedly asking to become one of his graduate students. After finding Hofstadter's phone number at MIT, a determined Mitchell made several calls, all of which went unanswered. She was ultimately successful in reaching Hofstadter after calling at 11 p.m., and secured an internship working on the development of Copycat.

In the fall of 1984, Mitchell followed Hofstadter to the University of Michigan, submitting a "last minute" application to the university's doctoral program. She earned her Ph.D. in 1990 with the dissertation Copycat: A Computer Model of High-Level Perception and Conceptual Slippage in Analogy-Making.

Views 
While expressing strong support for AI research, Mitchell has expressed concern about AI's vulnerability to hacking as well as its ability to inherit social biases. On artificial general intelligence, Mitchell said in 2019 that "commonsense knowledge" and "humanlike abilities for abstraction and analogy making" might constitute the final step required to build superintelligent machines, but that current technology was not close to being able to solve this current problem. Mitchell believes that humanlike visual intelligence would require "general knowledge, abstraction, and language", and hypothesizes that visual understanding may have to be learned as an embodied agent rather than merely viewing pictures.

Selected publications

Books

Articles

References

External links
 Mitchell's professional homepage
 

Cellular automatists
Complex systems scientists
Living people
Portland State University faculty
University of Michigan alumni
Santa Fe Institute people
Brown University alumni
Los Alamos National Laboratory personnel
Oregon Health & Science University faculty
Year of birth missing (living people)
Researchers of artificial life